This is a list of satellite television providers, operating around the world.

Africa

Middle East and North Africa
beIN
My-HD
OSN

Ghana
Crystal TV - Digital Terrestrial
Multichoice - DSTV & GOTV
Multitv - Multichannel free to air
RCS - Multichannel free to air
StarTimes - Digital Terrestrial

Nigeria
African Cable Television - commenced operations on the 1st of December 2014. Operations were discontinued a few months later.
CTL
Daarsat
DStv Other networks like HiTV (out of operations) and StarTimes have increased the competitiveness of the cable TV market.
GOtv
KAFTAN TV
Kwese TV - discontinued her DTH operation in 2019
Metro Digital
Montage Cable Network Also commenced operations in 2014 but is no longer in operations.
Mytv
OurTV
Play Consat
Sairtek is a top broadcast service provider in lagos Nigeria, sairtek provides free to air broadcasting, live streaming, satellite, OTT and IPTV, distribution and contribution services.
StarTimes - DTT and DTH operator
TrendTV
TStv was off air but back on air since October 2020

East Africa
azam TV
Canal+
DStv
StarTimes

South Africa
DStv
OpenView HD
StarSat

Asia

Afghanistan
Oqaab

Bangladesh
AKASH Digital TV

Cambodia
Cambodian DTV Network

India
Airtel digital TV
DD Free Dish
Dish TV
Sun Direct
Tata Play
Videocon d2h

Indonesia
Kugosky
K-Vision
MNC Vision
Nex Parabola
Skynindo
Transvision

Israel
yes

Japan
SKY PerfecTV!
Wowow

Malaysia
Astro
MYTV Broadcasting DTH
Sirius TV

Mongolia
DDishTV
Mongolsat Networks

Myanmar
Canal+
Sky Net

Nepal
DishHome
Net TV Nepal

Pakistan
MAG DTH
ShahzadSky DTH
Startime

Philippines
Cignal
G Sat
Sky Direct

South Korea
KT SkyLife

Sri Lanka
Dialog TV
Dish TV
Freesat

Thailand
DTV
Good TV
GMM Z
IPM TV
PSI TV
TrueVisions

Vietnam
An Viên Television (MobiTV)
K+
Vietnam Multimedia Corporation

Oceania

Australia
Foxtel
VAST

New Zealand
Freeview
SKY

Europe

Albania
DigitAlb
Tring

Austria
HD Austria
Sky

Belgium
Télésat
TV Vlaanderen

Bosnia and Herzegovina
TotalTV

Bulgaria
A1
Bulsatcom
neosat
Vivacom

Croatia
A1
MAXtv
TotalTV

Cyprus
Nova Cyprus

Czech Republic
Fotelka TV
Skylink
Telly

Denmark
Allente

Estonia
Home3

Finland
Allente

France
Bis TV
Canal+
Fransat

Georgia
MagtiCom

Germany
HD+
Sky

Greece
Cosmote TV
Nova

Hungary
Digi
Direct One
Telekom

Ireland
Sky

Italy
Sky
Tivùsat

Latvia
Home3

Lithuania
Home3

Luxembourg
Télésat

Montenegro
M Sat TV
TotalTV

Netherlands
Canal Digitaal

North Macedonia
Mtel
TotalTV

Norway
Allente

Poland
Canal+
Orange
Polsat Box

Portugal
MEO
NOS

Romania
Digi
Focus Sat
Freesat
Orange

Russia
MTS
NTV Plus
Telekarta
Tricolor TV

Serbia
mts
Polaris Media
TotalTV

Slovakia
Antik Sat
Fotelka TV
Magio Sat
Skylink

Slovenia
TotalTV

Spain
Movistar Plus+

Sweden
Allente

Switzerland
Canal+
Sky

Turkey
D-Smart
Digiturk
Tivibu

Ukraine
MYtv
Viasat
Xtra TV

United Kingdom
Freesat
Sky

Americas

Argentina
Antina
Vrio Corp.

Bolivia
Inter

Brazil
Claro TV
Oi TV
SKY Brasil

Canada
Bell Satellite TV
Glorystar
Shaw Direct
Telus TV

Chile
Claro TV
Entel
Movistar TV

Vrio Corp.

Colombia
Claro TV
Telefónica Colombia
Vrio Corp.

Costa Rica
Claro TV
Sky México

Dominican Republic
Claro TV
Sky México

Ecuador
Claro TV
Vrio Corp.

El Salvador
Claro TV
Sky México

Guatemala
Claro TV
Sky México

Honduras
Claro TV
Sky México

Mexico
Dish México
Sky México
Star TV

Nicaragua
Claro TV
Sky México

Panama
Claro TV
Sky México

Paraguay
Claro TV

Peru
Cable Mágico Satelital
Claro TV

Vrio Corp.

Puerto Rico
Claro TV
DirecTV
Dish Network
Kiwisat

United States
DirecTV
Dish Network
Glorystar

Uruguay
Vrio Corp.

Venezuela
CANTV
Inter
Movistar Venezuela
Simple TV (formerly called DirecTV Venezuela)

References

Direct broadcast satellite services
Lists of companies by industry